Hypertrophy is the increase in the volume of an organ or tissue due to the enlargement of its component cells. It is distinguished from hyperplasia, in which the cells remain approximately the same size but increase in number. Although hypertrophy and hyperplasia are two distinct processes, they frequently occur together, such as in the case of the hormonally-induced proliferation and enlargement of the cells of the uterus during pregnancy.

Eccentric hypertrophy is a type of hypertrophy where the walls and chamber of a hollow organ undergo growth in which the overall size and volume are enlarged. It is applied especially to the left ventricle of heart. Sarcomeres are added in series, as for example in dilated cardiomyopathy (in contrast to hypertrophic cardiomyopathy, a type of concentric hypertrophy, where sarcomeres are added in parallel).

Gallery

See also
 Athlete's heart
 Ventricular hypertrophy (including left ventricular hypertrophy and right ventricular hypertrophy)
 Muscle hypertrophy
 List of biological development disorders

References

External links 

University of California Muscle Physiology Home Page: Hypertrophy 

Muscular system
Tissues (biology)
Exercise physiology
Physical exercise
Anatomical pathology